Pratigyabadh is a 1991 Indian Hindi-language film directed by Ravi Chopra. It stars Mithun Chakraborty, Kumar Gaurav, Beena Banerjee, Neelam Kothari and Sunil Dutt.

Plot
Pratigyabadh is the story of a simple man (Mithun Chakraborty), and his brother (Kumar Gaurav), their love and the hurdles they face in life. Shankar grows up to become the right-hand man of a Sunil Dutt who is a smuggler of Gold. In early childhood, he saw his mother getting molested by truck driver Tejaa ( Anupam Kher) and dying in front of him. He wants to take vengeance from moneylender because of him, his family became homeless and the truck driver who molested his mother. But now the truck driver is not a normal truck driver or small criminal. He is a dangerous smuggler. How the situation brings face to face Shankar and Tejaa and how he takes revenge against Tejaa forms the rest of story.

Cast

 Mithun Chakraborty as Shankar Yadav
 Kumar Gaurav as Shakti Yadav
 Neelam Kothari as Shobhna
 Sunil Dutt as Pascal
 Lalit Tiwari as Baburam Yadav
 Beena Banerjee as Laxmi Baburam Yadav
 Amita Nangia as Shankar Sister
 Shafi Inamdar as S. Merchant
 Anupam Kher as Tej Bahadur / Tejaa / Shersingh, Truck Driver
 Sujata Mehta as Phoolrani
 Yunus Parvez as Lala Kedarnath, Transport Agency Owner
 Sharat Saxena as Tarzan
 Asrani
 Girja Shankar as Lala Sukhilal
 Mulraj Rajda as Sarpanch of village
 Mayur Verma as Corrupt Police Inspector Dholakia
 Ashalata Wabgaonkar as Nun (as Ashalata)
 Roopesh Kumar as Tej Bahadur/ Teja henchman
 Javed Hyder as Adolscent Shankar

Soundtrack
All songs are written by Hasan Kamal.

External links
 
 Cult of Kumar

1991 films
1990s Hindi-language films
Films scored by Kalyanji Anandji
Films directed by Ravi Chopra